Wolverhampton Low Level was a railway station on Sun Street, in Springfield, Wolverhampton, England.

It was built by the Great Western Railway (GWR), on their route from London Paddington to Birkenhead, via Birmingham Snow Hill. It was the most northerly broad-gauge station on the GWR network.

Design

The OWWR's engineer, John Fowler, designed the frontage, while the GWR's Isambard Kingdom Brunel designed the layout.

The station building is two storeys high and constructed of Staffordshire blue brick in Italianate style, which is an unusual combination but the blue brick was abundant in the area in the 19th century. The design of the station was similar to that of the earlier High Level station. The main building has a large pediment; tall, round-headed, pedimented windows with ashlar brackets on the first floor which the main entrance on the ground floor. Plainer wings extend to either side of the main building which protrude to the front. The interior of the former booking hall continues the Italianate theme, with a high, coved ceiling and full-height cornices. The interior was carefully restored in the early 2000s.

History

The station opened in 1854, although construction was not completed until late 1855. The station was built jointly by the Oxford, Worcester and Wolverhampton Railway (OWWR) and the Great Western Railway (GWR). The station was initially called Wolverhampton Joint and was renamed to Wolverhampton Low Level in April 1856, at the same time as the nearby London and North Western Railway station was renamed from Wolverhampton Queen Street to Wolverhampton High Level.

The station was converted to standard gauge in 1869, and remained basically the same until 1922, when new booking office was built within the booking hall, and a new telegraph department was added to the stationmaster's office. The platforms were extended and the passenger footbridge was replaced. The overall roof had corroded badly and was replaced with standard GWR platform canopies.

In July 1939, an Irish Republican Army bomb exploded at the station, wrecking the parcels office area.

Closure
Closure of the station was made likely by the West Coast Main Line electrification scheme started in 1959, which included the Stour Valley Line, a rebuilt High Level station, and new connections between the former LMS and GWR systems north of the town. From late 1963 to March 1967 the Low Level saw a considerable increase in traffic, but this was only while the electrification work was in progress, as many services were temporarily diverted away from the High Level.

When the Stour Valley Line reopened, the services through Low Level were quickly reduced. The last London to Birkenhead express ran in March 1967, and in 1968 Shrewsbury services switched to the High Level. By 1970, the only services left running from Low Level were local trains to Birmingham Snow Hill via Wednesbury Central. This service ceased when the line closed to passengers in 1972.

In 1970, the station was converted to a Parcels Concentration Department. Much of the trackwork was removed, the north signal box was demolished and the platforms were greatly modified. It opened on 6 April 1970 and was very successful, handling up to 8,000 parcels each day.

However, British Rail's policy on parcel handling soon changed, and the station was closed on 12 June 1981.

The building was listed as Grade II on 25 March 1986. It remained as the British Rail Divisional Engineer's Department until it was purchased by Wolverhampton Metropolitan Borough Council in May 1986, who immediately renovated and preserved the exterior. Meanwhile, the route of the trackbed between Bushbury and Birmingham Snow Hill was preserved in case of future reopening of the line.

Redevelopment
During the 1980s and 1990s, there were several proposals for redevelopment of the site, including re-opening the station and converting the station into a transport museum, but none came to fruition.

In 1999, the Midland Metro tramway opened, using most of the GWR route between Wolverhampton and Birmingham, but this turns towards the centre of Wolverhampton to run along the A41 Bilston Road before reaching Low Level.

Redevelopment of the Low Level station site began in 2006, retaining the main station building (which is a listed building) whilst the remainder of the station, including the former main southbound platform was demolished to make way for a 'mixed use' retail, hotel and residential development. This redevelopment of the station is now complete, following the opening of Aldi in 2019. The station building itself was destined to become a casino. This has now fallen through. 
The restored station was home to an art gallery until July 2010.
The station building has been transformed into the Grand Station banqueting hall and wedding venue.

Station surrounds
Several other structures associated with the station are listed buildings. A tall, blue-brick retaining wall and subway lead beneath the High Level tracks to the station, originally built as a shortcut between the two stations and known as "the colonnades". The brickwork on the interior is glazed white, and has decorative iron railings mounted to it The wall and subway form a grade II listed building. Due to the construction of the replacement High Level Station, the colonnades and subway were closed temporarily and as of December 2021, remain closed.

References

Further reading

External links

Subterranea Britannica
Wolverhampton City Council regeneration
Rail Around Birmingham and the West Midlands: Wolverhampton Low Level railway station
Article from Disused Stations

Former Great Western Railway stations
Disused railway stations in Wolverhampton
Grade II listed buildings in the West Midlands (county)
Railway stations in Great Britain opened in 1854
Railway stations in Great Britain closed in 1972
1854 establishments in England
1972 disestablishments in England